Evil Eye may refer to:
Evil eye, a look that is believed by many cultures to be able to cause injury or bad luck for the person at whom it is directed

Film 
 The Evil Eye (1913 film), an American silent short starring Mary Ryan
 The Evil Eye (1917 film), an American silent feature by George Melford
 The Evil Eye (1920 serial), an American silent action film series by J. Gordon Cooper and Wally Van
 The Evil Eye (1937 film), a Belgian feature by Charles Dekeukeleire
 The Evil Eye (1963 film) or The Girl Who Knew Too Much, an Italian giallo by Mario Bava 
 Evil Eyes, a 2004 American horror film by Mark Atkins
 Evil Eye (2020 film), a 2020 American horror film from Blumhouse Productions and Purple Pebble Pictures

Television episodes 
 "The Evil Eye" (Happy Days)
 "The Evil Eye" (Inhumanoids)
 "Evil Eye" (Seeing Things)
 "Evil Eye" (Taggart)
 "Evil Eyes" (72 Hours: True Crime)

Songs
 "Evil Eye" (Franz Ferdinand song) by Franz Ferdinand from Right Thoughts, Right Words, Right Action
 "Evil Eye" (KT Tunstall song), a 2016 song by KT Tunstall from KIN
 "Evil Eye", a song by Fu Manchu from The Action Is Go
 "Evil Eye", a song by Beady Eye from BE
 "Evil Eyes", a song by Dio from The Last in Line
 "Evil Eye", a song by Yngwie Malmsteen from Rising Force
 "Evil Eye", a song by Takida from ...Make You Breathe
 "Evil Eye", a song by Edward W. Hardy from Three Pieces Inspired by Edgar Allan Poe
 "Evil Eyes", a song by Styx from Man of Miracles
 "Evil Eye", a song by Black Sabbath from Cross Purposes
 "Evil Eye", a song by Motörhead from Bad Magic
 "Evil Eye", a song by Billy Idol from Devil's Playground

Other uses 
 "The Evil Eye" (1830 short fiction) by Mary Shelley
 Evil Eye (comics), a fictional disembodied eye in Whoopee!! comics
 Evil Eye of Avalon or the Evil Eye, a fictional magical artifact in the Marvel Universe
 The Evil Eye (Ravenloft), a 1996 adventure module for Advanced Dungeons & Dragons
 An Evil Eye, a 2011 novel by Jason Goodwin

See also
 Brown Eye, Evil Eye, a 1967 film drama directed by Robert Argus